Joan Doran Hedrick (born May 1, 1944) is a Pulitzer Prize-winning historian and biographer of Harriet Beecher Stowe and Jack London.

Early life and career
Hedrick was born in Baltimore, Maryland, to Paul Thomas Doran and Jane Connorton Doran.

She earned an A.B. degree from Vassar College in 1966, and a Ph.D. from Brown University in 1974. Her Ph.D. dissertation at Brown was titled "The True American: Henry Adams, Theodore Roosevelt, 'Prufrock', and Others". She taught at Wesleyan University in Middletown, Connecticut from 1972 through 1980 and in 1980 began teaching at Trinity College in Hartford, Connecticut.

Works
In 1982, Hedrick's first book, Solitary Comrade: Jack London and His Work, was published by the University of North Carolina Press. Her book Harriet Beecher Stowe: A Life was published in 1994 by Oxford University Press, and won the 1995 Pulitzer Prize for Biography or Autobiography. The book also received favorable reviews from The New York Times and Publishers Weekly.

References

External links
Faculty page at Trinity College, Hartford, Connecticut

Living people
1944 births
21st-century American historians
Historians of the United States
Brown University alumni
Vassar College alumni
Trinity College (Connecticut) faculty
Wesleyan University faculty
Pulitzer Prize for Biography or Autobiography winners